Louis Karchin (born September 8, 1951) is an American composer, conductor and educator who has composed over 90 works including unaccompanied and chamber music, symphonic works and opera.

Karchin was born in Philadelphia, Pennsylvania, and is Professor of Music at New York University. He received a B. Mus. degree from the Eastman School of Music, an M.A. and Ph.D. from Harvard University, and was twice a Leonard Bernstein Fellow at Tanglewood. His principal teachers included Samuel Adler, Joseph Schwantner, Leon Kirchner, Earl Kim and Gunther Schuller.

Composer 
Karchin's music has been recognized by awards from the American Academy of Arts and Letters (Andrew Imbrie Award, Goddard Lieberson Fellowship, and Walter N. Hinrichsen Award), the National Endowment for the Arts, and the John Simon Guggenheim Foundation. He has received commissions from the Serge Koussevitzky, Fromm, and Barlow Foundations.

His 70-minute chamber opera, Romulus, a setting of the Alexandre Dumas, père play, was premiered at the Peter B. Lewis Theatre of the Guggenheim Museum in May, 2007" and subsequently issued on a Naxos CD.  Other major works include American Visions, a vocal-instrumental song-cycle on poems of Yevgeny Yevtushenko (New World Records), and a masque, Orpheus, based on a poem by Stanley Kunitz (Albany Records). Of the latter, critic Jules Langert wrote of its San Francisco premiere that “[t]he music seemed in constant flux, creating strong, richly textured sonorities… and brilliant splashes of color; this Orpheus floated on an incandescent fabric of sound.”

Conductor 
Active as a conductor and presenter of new music, Karchin co-founded the Harvard Group for New Music, the Chamber Players of the League-ISCM, and the Orchestra of the League of Composers.  With these groups, he conducted New York or world premieres of works by Elliott Carter, Charles Wuorinen, Joan Tower, Julia Wolfe, Milton Babbitt, Bernard Rands, David Rakowski, Arthur Kreiger, and Jason Treuting, among others.

Selected compositions
 Karchin's music is published by C.F. Peters and the American Composers Alliance

 Two Lyrics for Solo Cello (2012)
 Four Songs on Poems of Seamus Heaney (2012) for soprano and chamber ensemble
 Evocations (2010) clarinet and percussion
 Chamber Symphony (2009)
 Three Epigrams for piano (2008) compilation of Celebration, Expressions, and Upheavals
 The Gods of Winter (2006) Poetry by Dana Gioia for baritone and chamber ensemble
 Chesapeake Festival Overture (2006) for orchestra. Commissioned by the Fromm Foundation at Harvard for the Chesapeake Symphony and the Alba Music Festival (Italy).
 Rhapsody (2005) for violin and piano
 Matrix and Dream (2004) Poetry of Paul Auster, for soprano and piano, commissioned by Works & Process at the Guggenheim 
 Orpheus (2003) A masque for baritone, chamber ensemble and dancers. Poetry by Stanley Kunitz
 To the Sun (2003) Orphic Hymn circa 300 A. D., for soprano and piano
 To the Stars (2003) Orphic Hymn circa 300 A. D. for a cappella chorus
 Carmen de Boheme (2002) for soprano and piano
 Ghost Waltz (2002) for piano
 Quartet for Percussion  (2000) Commissioned by the Serge Koussevitzky Music Foundation of the Library of Congress for the Talujon Percussion Quartet
 American Visions: Two Songs on Poems of Yevgeny Yevtushenko (1998) Heckscher Foundation Award, 1999
 String Quartet No. 2 (1995) 
 Rustic Dances (1995) violin, clarinet and marimba
 Sonata da Camera (1995) for violin and piano
 Ricercare (1992) violin, unaccompanied
 Galactic Folds (1992) for chamber ensemble
 String Quartet (1991) 
 Romulus, an opera in one act, based on a play by Alexander Dumas (1990, rev. 2005) Prizewinner, National Opera Association, 1990 Chamber Opera Competition
 Sonata for Violoncello and Piano (1990)
 Songs of Distance and Light (1988) for soprano and chamber ensemble. Poetry by Elizabeth Bishop and Jennifer Rose
 Five Songs on Poems of Sue Standing (1985) 
 Songs of John Keats (1984) for soprano and chamber ensemble
 Viola Variations for viola and piano (1981)
 Capriccio (1977) for violin and seven instruments. First prize winner, New Music Consort Competition, 1981
 Fantasy for violin or viola solo (1972)

Selected recordings
  Five Compositions (2009-2019) (Bridge 9543)
 Jane Eyre Naxos 2019
 Dark Mountains/Distant Lights (New Focus FCR225)
  To the Sun and Stars (Bridge 9437)
  Romulus an opera in one act. (Naxos 8.669030) Katrina Thurman, Steven Ebel, Thomas Meglioranza, Wilbur Pauley, Washington Square Ensemble, Karchin conducting.   
 Matrix: Music of Louis Karchin. Albany Records (Troy 895); Roethke Songs, Fanfare/Pavane, Fanfare for Marty, Voyages, Quartet for Percussion, Plaint, Matrix and Dream - poem of Paul Auster
 Orpheus and Other Vocal Works. Albany Records (Troy 770)
 American Visions New World Records (NW-80583) Rustic Dances, American Visions: Two Songs on Poems of Yevgeny Yevtushenko, Cascades, Sonata da camera, A Way Separate…, String Quartet #2 
 Music of Louis Karchin New World/CRI (NWCR739) Galactic Folds, Songs of Distance and Light, Ricercare, Sonata for Violoncello and Piano

Footnotes

Sources
Louis Karchin faculty biography at New York University University

External links
Official Louis Karchin website
Louis Karchin at the American Composers Alliance
Louis Karchin at Edition Peters

1951 births
Harvard University alumni
Eastman School of Music alumni
Living people
20th-century classical composers
21st-century classical composers
American male classical composers
American classical composers
Musicians from Philadelphia
21st-century American composers
20th-century American composers
Classical musicians from Pennsylvania
20th-century American male musicians
21st-century American male musicians